Sergey Tsibuinikov is a Russian sprint canoer who competed in the early 1990s. He won a bronze medal in the K-4 10000 m event at the 1993 ICF Canoe Sprint World Championships in Copenhagen.

References

Living people
Russian male canoeists
Year of birth missing (living people)
ICF Canoe Sprint World Championships medalists in kayak